TikTok, Boom. is a 2022 documentary film about the social media app TikTok. The film is directed by Shalini Kantayya and premiered at the 2022 Sundance Film Festival. The film was released on the PBS program Independent Lens on October 24, 2022.

Reception 

Writing for Variety, film critic Owen Gleiberman applauded the film for its informative deep-dive into TikTok, citing its evaluation of censorship and ethics concerns as highlights. Conversely, he took issue with what he described as the film's "eagerness to accept and endorse the way TikTok operates", especially concerning its complicated algorithm.

References

External links
 TikTok, Boom.

2022 films
2022 documentary films
Films about social media